Highs in the Mid-Sixties, Volume 20 is a compilation album in the Highs in the Mid-Sixties series; it is subtitled L.A., Part 4 and features recordings that were released in Los Angeles. Highs in the Mid-Sixties, Volume 1, Highs in the Mid-Sixties, Volume 2, and Highs in the Mid-Sixties, Volume 3 also showcase music from Los Angeles; while two of the later CDs in the Pebbles series, Pebbles, Volume 8 and Pebbles, Volume 9 feature bands from throughout Southern California.

Release data
This album was released in 1985 as an LP by AIP Records (as #AIP-10029).

Notes on the tracks
A 10-inch vinyl album has recently been released of all of the songs by the Dovers, considered one of the finest garage rock bands. Both sides of the first single by the Human Expression are given on the Pebbles, Volume 10 LP and Highs in the Mid-Sixties, Volume 3; this song is the B-side from their second single. The Mugwumps are not the New York band called the Mugwumps that helped spawn the Mamas & the Papas and the Lovin' Spoonful.
Note: That is my band Aftermath on the cover, but the track is not us..Its a studio track,and we never recorded 'Gloria' except on a home recorder..we knew the words better than this,but its ok.. Aloha from Bradley

Track listing

Side 1
 Rain: "E.S.P." (Larry Self) — rel. 1966
 The Mugwumps: "Bald Headed Woman" (Shel Talmy)
 The Green Beans: "Who Needs You" (Grieger/Bozile)
 The Gigolos: "She's My Baby" (Hutman)
 The Human Expression: "Calm Me Down" (Jim Foster/Jim Quarles)
 The Rumblers: "Don't Need You No More" (A. Lloyd/W. Matteson)
 Aftermath: "Gloria" (Van Morrison)

Side 2
 The Agents: "Gotta Help Me" (Richards/Todd/Marky/Shay) — rel. 1965
 The Avengers: "It's Hard to Hide" (G. Likens)
 The Avengers: "Open Your Eyes" (G. Blake)
 The Bees: "Forget Me Girl" (Robert Zinner)
 The Dovers: "The Third Eye" (The Dovers) — rel. 1966
 The No-Na-Mees: "Just Wanna Be Myself" (Doug Wareham)
 The Last Word: "Sleepy Hollow" (Berry Abernathy)

Pebbles (series) albums
1985 compilation albums
Music of Los Angeles